Cercis occidentalis, the western redbud or California redbud (syn. Cercis orbiculata — Greene), is a small tree or shrub in the legume family, Fabaceae. It is found across the American Southwest, from California to Utah and Arizona.

It is easily recognized when it is in bloom from March to May, when it is covered with small pink to purple flowers.

Description
Cercis occidentalis has thin, shiny brown branches that bear shiny heart-shaped leaves which are light green early in the season and darken as they age. Leaves on plants at higher elevation may turn gold or red as the weather cools.

The showy flowers are bright pink or magenta, and they grow in clusters all over the shrub, making the plant very colorful and noticeable in the landscape. The shrub bears 3-inch-long brown legume pods which are very thin and dry. Its native habitats include dry slopes and foothills of canyons below .

Uses
Indigenous Californians use the twigs of the western redbud to weave baskets, and even prune the shrub to encourage growth of new twigs. The bark provides a faint reddish dye for the finished basketry.

Cultivation
Cercis occidentalis is cultivated as an ornamental plant and tree, for planting in parks and gardens, and as a street tree. It is also used in drought tolerant, native plant, and wildlife gardens.

Images

References

 Casebeer, M. (2004). Discover California Shrubs. Sonora, California: Hooker Press.

External links
Jepson Manual Treatment — Cercis occidentalis (western redbud)
CalFlora Database: Cercis occidentalis
USDA Plants Profile: Cercis orbiculata (Cercis occidentalis)
Interactive Distribution Map for Cercis occidentalis

occidentalis
Flora of California
Flora of Arizona
Flora of Nevada
Flora of Utah
Flora of the Sierra Nevada (United States)
Natural history of the California Coast Ranges
Garden plants of North America
Drought-tolerant plants
Ornamental trees
Flora without expected TNC conservation status